The USRA Heavy Pacific was a USRA standard class of steam locomotive designed under the control of the United States Railroad Administration, the nationalized railroad system in the United States during World War I. This was the standard heavy passenger locomotive of the USRA types, and was 4-6-2 wheel arrangement in the Whyte notation, or 2′C1′ in UIC classification.

Roster fleet

Original locomotives
A total of 20 locomotives were built under USRA control, with the production split between the Baldwin Locomotive Works and the American Locomotive Company's Richmond plant; these were sent to the following railroads:

Locomotive copies
Other post-USRA derivatives include the  Baltimore and Ohio P-7 and the Southern Railway Ps-4 classes, the former having larger 80 inch drivers, higher tractive effort, and increased boiler pressure, and the latter with smaller 73 inch drivers, larger cabs, feedwater heaters, and later batches given larger tenders.

Three locomotive copies were preserved, such as Atlanta and West Point No. 290 built by Lima in 1926, which ran excursions from 1989 to 1992 and is now under cosmetic restoration at the Southeastern Railway Museum in Duluth, Georgia, the B&O P7 5300 at the B&O Railroad Museum in Baltimore, and Southern Railway Ps-4 No. 1401 at the National Museum of American History in Washington, D.C.

References

4-6-2 locomotives
USRA locomotives
Standard gauge locomotives of the United States
Scrapped locomotives
Railway locomotives introduced in 1918
Passenger locomotives